One Big Family is an American sitcom television series. The series stars Danny Thomas, Kim Gillingham, Anastasia Fielding, Michael DeLuise, Alison McMillan, Gabriel Damon and Anthony Starke. The series aired in syndication from September 27, 1986, to May 23, 1987.

Plot
Thomas plays Jake Hatton, a retired comedian in Seattle, who helps raise his nieces and nephews following the deaths of their parents.

Cast 
Danny Thomas as Jake Hatton 
Kim Gillingham as Jan Hatton 
Anastasia Fielding as Marianne Hatton 
Michael DeLuise as Brian Hatton 
Alison McMillan as Kate Hatton 
Gabriel Damon as Roger Hatton 
Anthony Starke as Don Hatton

Episodes

References

External links
 

1980s American sitcoms
English-language television shows
First-run syndicated television programs in the United States
1986 American television series debuts
1987 American television series endings
Television shows set in Seattle
Television series about families
Television series by Lorimar-Telepictures